Oropom may refer to:
the Oropom people
the Oropom language